White Zombie may refer to:
 White Zombie (band), an American heavy metal band from the 20th-century
 White Zombie (film), a 1932 American horror film starring Bela Lugosi
 White Zombie, a 2016 album by Paul Roland
 White Zombie, a record-holding vehicle in the National Electric Drag Racing Association
 "White Zombie" (Baltzola Cave in Spain), the site of the world's first 8c (5.14b) onsight climb performed by Yuji Hirayama

See also